Titus Vettius Scato (also Cato) was an Italian rebel commander, a general of the Marsi during the Social War. At the Battle of the Tolenus (11 June 90 BC) Scato and the Marsi ambushed the Roman consul, Publius Rutilius Lupus after the Romans crossed the River Tolenus. Unfortunately for Scato, Rutilius's senior legate, Gaius Marius, and his division were operating separately from Rutilis and crossed the river downstream of the battle, captured the Marsi camp, and then attacked the Marsi while they were still fighting Rutilius's army, routing them with heavy losses (8,000 Marsi killed). He defeated Lucius Julius Caesar in battle before marching on and capturing Aesernia. When he encountered an army under Pompey Strabo, instead of fighting, the two met, their armies treating each other without hatred. According to Seneca, he was captured by the Romans but was stabbed to death by his slave rather than face the ignominy of defeat.

References

1st-century BC deaths
1st-century BC Romans